Yacine Douma (born 5 April 1973 in Fréjus, Var) is a French judoka.

Achievements

Video
 Videos on Judovision.org

References

External links
 

1973 births
Living people
Sportspeople from Fréjus
French male judoka
Universiade medalists in judo
Universiade gold medalists for France
Medalists at the 1999 Summer Universiade
20th-century French people